Nikolay Pavlovich Shubin (born 1956), known as The Cemetery Director, is a Georgian-born Russian serial killer, who killed 13 homeless and single people between 2004 and 2006 in the city of Lipetsk.

Biography 
Shubin was born in Tbilisi. In 1976, Shubin was hospitalized in the Voronezh Regional Clinical Psychoneurogical Dispensary with a diagnosis of neurasthenia.

Shubin was arrested in October 2006, after policemen detained him in connection with the disappearance of a local pensioner named Mescheryakov. He had disappeared after going to the park to play a game of chess with Shubin. At the interrogation, Shubin immediately confessed to the murder and showed where he buried the body. During the investigation, he began to talk about another murder committed by him. Every week, he reported on his previous killings, and showed the locations where the bodies were buried. Shubin always disoriented his victims with a strong blow to the head, then bound their hands and feet with wire, and finally strangling them with a garrot, which he always carried with him. He did not express any shame for his crimes and talked about them proudly and very confidently. Shubin called himself the "Cemetery Director". The motive for the murders was simple - a quarrel or a loss at a game in chess.

During the investigation, Shubin was examined, and was diagnosed with a continuous type of paranoid schizophrenia. Because of this, the court found him unfit to stand trial and sentenced him to compulsory treatment.

See also
 List of Russian serial killers
 List of serial killers by number of victims

References

External links 
 "The Cemetery Director" is waiting for his sentence in a special hospital

1956 births
Georgian emigrants to Russia
Living people
Male serial killers
People acquitted by reason of insanity
People from Lipetsk
People with schizophrenia
Russian serial killers